Charles Frederick Powlett, 2nd Baron Bayning (26 September 1785 – 2 August 1823), known as the Honourable Charles Townshend from 1797 to 1810, was a British peer and Tory Member of Parliament.

Bayning was the eldest son of Charles Townshend, 1st Baron Bayning, son of William Townshend and Henrietta Powlett. His mother was Annabella Smith-Powlett, daughter of Reverend Richard Smith and Annabella Powlett. He was educated at Trinity College, Cambridge. In 1808 Bayning was elected to the House of Commons for Truro, a seat he held until 1810, when he succeeded his father in the barony and entered the House of Lords. In 1821 he assumed by Royal Licence the surname of Powlett in lieu of Townshend. He lived at Honingham Hall in Norfolk.

Lord Bayning died in August 1823, aged 37. He never married and was succeeded in the barony by his younger brother Henry.

See also
Marquess Townshend

Notes

References 

1785 births
1823 deaths
2
Charles Powlett
Powlett, Charles
Powlett, Charles
UK MPs who inherited peerages
People from Honingham
Alumni of Trinity College, Cambridge